Patania sabinusalis is a moth in the family Crambidae. It was described by Francis Walker in 1859. It is found in Australia, Cameroon, the Democratic Republic of the Congo (North Kivu, Equateur, Orientale), Kenya, the Seychelles, Somalia, Uganda, Zambia, Sri Lanka, India, Borneo, Java, Fiji, New Guinea, Samoa, the Solomon Islands, Taiwan and Japan.

The larvae feed on Boehmeria nivea, Urera hypselodendron, Triumfetta species, Cypholophus macrocephalus, Pipturus sp. and Musa textilis (Manila hemp).

References

Moths described in 1859
Moths of Africa
Moths of Asia
Spilomelinae
Taxa named by Francis Walker (entomologist)